Yuletide Records was a daughter record label of Modern Records, specialized only in Christmas music. Apparently only nine records were made, somewhere during the late sixties. Their slogan was "Great Sounds of Christmas" which carried a light green label with dark green print.

Discography 
 Famous Christmas Carols – Johnny Cole & Robert Evans Chorus
 O Come All Ye Faithful – Robert Evans Choir with Organ & Chimes
 Rudolph the Red Nosed Reindeer and Other Christmas Favorites – Johnny Cole & Robert Evans Chorus & Orchestra
 Christmas Favorites – Fred Kirby's Pipe Organ & Chimes
 White Christmas – Gordon Jenkins & Christmas Strings
 12 Days of Christmas – Johnny Cole & Robert Evans Chorus
 Silent Night: Organ and Chimes Favorites – William Daly
 Joy to the World – Juan Ditmar's Organ and Chimes
 The Little Drummer Boy – Voices of Christmas

See also 
 List of record labels

External links
 Yuletide discography

American record labels
Record labels established in 1968
Record labels disestablished in 1969
1968 establishments in the United States